Vardan Mkrtchi Ajemian (September 15, 1905 in Van, Ottoman Empire – January 24, 1977 in Yerevan, Soviet Armenia) was an Armenian theatrical director and actor. He was named People's Artist of USSR in 1965 and Hero of Socialist Labour in 1975.

Biography 
Ajemian studied in Yerevan and Moscow. In 1928 he founded the Second Armenian State Theatre (Gyumri State Theatre). In 1939 he moved to Yerevan Sundukian Theatre and became its artistic director. He directed Alexander Shirvanzade's For the Honour (1939), William Saroyan's My Heart is in the Mountains (1961), Papazian's Rock (1944), Nairi Zarian's Ara Geghetsik (1946), Aramashot Papayan's The World, Yes, Turned Upside Down (1967) and several musical presentations. He won State Prizes of the USSR in 1951 and of the Armenian SSR in 1971.

Awards 
 November 24, 1945 — Order of the Badge of Honor
 1951 — USSR State Prize, third level
 June 27, 1956 — Order of Lenin
 1970 — State Prize of the Armenian SSR
 December 8, 1975 — Hero of Socialist Labor with the award of the Order of Lenin

See also 
 Vardan Adjemyan (b. 1956) is a grandson.

Sources

Armenian Concise Encyclopedia, Ed. by acad. K. Khudaverdian, Yerevan, 1990, p. 147-148

External links
"Ajemian" stamp
 

1905 births
1977 deaths
People from Van, Turkey
People's Artists of the USSR
Armenians from the Ottoman Empire
Recipients of the Order of Lenin
Recipients of the USSR State Prize
Heroes of Socialist Labour
Burials at the Komitas Pantheon
Emigrants from the Ottoman Empire to the Russian Empire